Below is an incomplete list of diplomats from the United Kingdom to Prussia, specifically Heads of Missions sent to the Elector of Brandenburg and to the Kingdom of Prussia from its formation of in 1701.  From 1868, the ambassadors were attributed to the North German Confederation.

Heads of Mission

Envoys Extraordinary and Ministers Plenipotentiary to the Elector of Brandenburg
1680: Sir Robert Southwell
1689: Robert Sutton, 2nd Baron Lexinton, Envoy Extraordinary
1690–1692: James Johnson
1692: George Stepney in charge
1692–1698: apparently no representation
1698–c.1700: George Stepney Envoy Extraordinary
1699–1703: Philip Plantamour in charge
1700: James Cressett Envoy Extraordinary

Envoys Extraordinary and Ministers Plenipotentiary to the King of Prussia
1701: Thomas Wentworth, 3rd Baron Raby Special Mission
1703–1711: Thomas Wentworth, 3rd Baron Raby Envoy Extraordinary until 1705, then Ambassador
1704 and 1705: John Churchill, 1st Duke of Marlborough visited Berlin
1708: Maj.-Gen. Francis Palmes Envoy Extraordinary
1711: Charles Whitworth Special Mission
1712–1714: Brigadier William Britton
1715: Archibald Douglas, 2nd Earl of Forfar
1716: Alexander, Lord Polwarth, also to Denmark
1716–1717: Charles Whitworth
1719–1722: Charles Whitworth Minister Plenipotentiary
1720: The Earl Cadogan Special mission
1720: The Earl Stanhope Special mission
1722–1724: James Scott Minister
1724–1730: Charles Du Bourgay Envoy Extraordinary
1726: Richard Sutton
1730: Sir Charles Hotham Special Mission
1730–1741: Col. Guy Melchior Dickens Secretary until 1740, then Minister
1741: Thomas Robinson Special Mission
1741–1744: John Carmichael, 3rd Earl of Hyndford Envoy Extraordinary and Plenipotentiary
1744–1747: Frederick Lorentz Secretary, in charge
1746: Hon. Thomas Villiers Minister Plenipotentiary
1747–1749: Henry Legge
1750–1751: Charles Hanbury Williams
1751–1756: Apparently no representation
1756–1771: Andrew Mitchell Minister 1756–1760; Minister Plenipotentiary 1760–1764; Envoy Extraordinary and Plenipotentiary 1766–1771
1758: Joseph Yorke Minister Plenipotentiary
1771–1772: Robert Gunning
1772–1776: James Harris
1777–1782: Hugh Elliot
1782: George Cholmondeley, 4th Earl of Cholmondeley
1782–1784: Sir John Stepney, Bt
1785–1787: John Dalrymple, Viscount Dalrymple
1788–1791: Joseph Ewart Envoy Extraordinary
1791–1793: Sir Morton Eden
1793–1794: James Harris, 1st Baron Malmesbury
1794–1795: Arthur Paget envoy extraordinary – special mission.
1795: Lord Henry Spencer
1795–1799: Thomas Bruce, 7th Earl of Elgin
1796: George Hammond Extraordinary Mission
1798: Granville Leveson-Gower Special Mission
1798: Rt. Hon. Thomas Grenville Special Mission
1800–1802: John Proby, 1st Earl of Carysfort
1802–1806: Francis Jackson
1805–1806: Dudley Ryder, Baron Harrowby Special Mission
1806: Charles Stanhope, 3rd Earl of Harrington Special Mission
1806: George Howard, Viscount Morpeth Plenipotentiary
1806: Lieut-Gen. Baron Hutchinson Plenipotentiary
1806–1807: No representation due to the occupation of Hanover
1807: Benjamin Garlike Minister ad interim
1807–1808: John Frere
1808–1813: No representation due to the Treaties of Tilsit
1813–1814: Hon. Sir Charles Stewart
1815–1823: George Rose
1823–1827: Richard Meade, 3rd Earl of Clanwilliam
1827–1830: Sir Brook Taylor
1830–1832: George Chad
1832: Baron Durham Special Mission
1832–1834: Gilbert Elliot-Murray-Kynynmound, 2nd Earl of Minto
1834–1835: Sir George Shee, Bt
1835–1841: Lord George Russell
1841–1851: John Fane, 11th Earl of Westmorland
1851–1860: John Bloomfield, 2nd Baron Bloomfield
1860–1862: Lord Augustus Loftus

Ambassadors Extraordinary and Plenipotentiary
1862–1864: Sir Andrew Buchanan
1864–1866: Francis Napier, 10th Lord Napier
1866–1868: Lord Augustus Loftus
Loftus becomes ambassador to Prussia's successor state, the North German Confederation

See also
 List of diplomats of the United Kingdom to Germany for diplomatic representation after 1868

References

Prussia
List
Diplomats of the United Kingdom